Isa is the eighth full-length studio album by Norwegian metal band Enslaved. Several tracks segue continuously into one another and the majority of compositions are composed of multiple interlocking movements.

Track listing

Personnel

Enslaved
 Grutle Kjellson – harsh vocals, bass 
 Ivar Bjørnson – guitar
 Arve Isdal – guitar
 Herbrand Larsen – keyboards; hammond, piano, mellotron, clean vocals
 Cato Bekkevold (from Red Harvest) – drums, percussion

Additional personnel
 Truls Espedal, Asle Birkeland – cover art
 Abbath Doom Occulta - backing vocals - "Lunar Force"
 Nocturno Culto - additional vocals - "Isa" and "Bounded by Allegiance"
 Dennis Reksten (from El-Regn) - additional synthesizers
 Ofu Khan (from Red Harvest) - vocals on "Ascension"
 Stig Sandbakk - additional vocals on "Ascension" and "Return to Yggdrasill"

Production
 Production: Pytten and Enslaved
 Engineering: Pytten and Herbrand Larsen
 Mixing: Lars Klokkerhaug
 Mastering: Peter In de Betou

References 

Enslaved (band) albums
2004 albums